Nysius huttoni, the wheat bug, is a species of seed bug, an insect in the family Lygaeidae. It was formerly endemic to New Zealand, but was introduced to Europe, including Belgium, France, the Netherlands, and the United Kingdom. In New Zealand, it is an economically important pest of wheat and crops in the mustard family.

References

huttoni
Hemiptera of New Zealand